Aleksandar Nosković (Serbian Cyrillic: Александар Носковић; born 12 December 1988) is a Serbian professional footballer who plays as a forward.

Career
Nosković started out at his local club Preporod Novi Žednik, before making his senior debuts with Radnički Bajmok. He was transferred to Spartak Subotica in the 2007 winter transfer window. After spending a season at Zlatibor Voda, Nosković rejoined Spartak Subotica following the merger of these two clubs. He spent a total of six seasons with the Golubovi, amassing 131 appearances and scoring 22 goals in the top flight. In the summer of 2014, Nosković moved abroad to Greece and signed for Ergotelis.

Statistics

External links
 
 
 

Association football forwards
Ergotelis F.C. players
Expatriate footballers in Greece
FK Bačka 1901 players
FK Spartak Subotica players
OFK Bačka players
Serbian expatriate footballers
Serbian expatriate sportspeople in Greece
Serbian First League players
Serbian footballers
Serbian SuperLiga players
Sportspeople from Subotica
Super League Greece players
1988 births
Living people